Amarnath Peak is a mountain with a peak elevation of , in the Ganderbal district of the Indian union territory of Jammu and Kashmir, in the vicinity of Sonamarg. Amarnath Peak is part of the Himalayas, and is located south of Zojila and west of Machoi Glacier. It lies 117 km northeast from Srinagar, 13 km from Baltal in the southeast. It lies 6 km south of Zojila. The melt waters form a major tributary of the Sind River at Baltal.

Amarnath mountain is considered as a sacred mountain, it has a cave at its south face at an elevation of  known as Amarnath cave. The cave is believed to be the ancient and among most sacred places for pilgrimage in Hinduism. It is the centre for Hindu pilgrims during summer.

Climbing history and routes
Due to its religious importance, Amarnath Peak is not climbed. It was first surveyed in 1912 by a British medical team headed by Ernest Neve, who surveyed most of the peaks of this Himalayan range. The Scottish Colonel N. N. L. Watts also went through the tracks of this peak and discovered an easy route to ascend the peak in 1933, which leads from Zojila down to the south and a glacial ascent to the summit of Amarnath Peak.

Apart from the Zojila side, Amarnath Peak can be reached leaving the cave on the left side and climbing through the east face. The route as discovered by Watts is from the north face which is accessible from Srinagar  by road NH 1D,  from Sonamarg and  climb to the glacier of the peak.

References 

Mountains of Jammu and Kashmir
Geography of Ganderbal district